Charles Kushner (born May 16, 1954) is an American real estate developer and disbarred former attorney. He founded Kushner Companies in 1985.

In 2005, he was convicted of illegal campaign contributions, tax evasion, and witness tampering and was sentenced to two years imprisonment, which he served in the Federal Prison Camp, Montgomery. As a convicted felon he was also disbarred in three states. He later received a federal pardon issued by President Donald Trump on December 23, 2020.

His son Jared Kushner is the husband of Ivanka Trump and son-in-law of former President Donald Trump, during whose presidential administration he served as senior advisor from 2017 to 2021. He has 3 other children including Joshua Kushner and he is the father-in-law of Karlie Kloss.

Early life
Charles Kushner was born on May 16, 1954, to Joseph Berkowitz and Rae Kushner, Jewish Holocaust survivors born in eastern Poland who came to America from the USSR in 1949. At birth, he was named Chanan, after a maternal uncle who died in a concentration camp during the Holocaust. He grew up in Elizabeth, New Jersey, with his elder brother Murray Kushner and sister Esther Schulder. His father worked as a construction worker, builder, and real estate investor. Kushner graduated from the Hofstra University School of Law in 1979.

Career

Kushner Companies 
In 1985, he began managing his father's portfolio of 4,000 New Jersey apartments. He founded Kushner Companies – headquartered in Florham Park, New Jersey – and became its chairman. In 1999, he won the Ernst & Young New Jersey Entrepreneur of the Year award. At the time, Kushner Companies had grown to more than 10,000 residential apartments, a homebuilding business, commercial and industrial properties, and a community bank.

Criminal conviction 
On June 30, 2004, Kushner was fined $508,900 by the Federal Election Commission for contributing to Democratic political campaigns in the names of his partnerships when he lacked authorization to do so. In 2005, following an investigation by the U.S. Attorney's Office for the District of New Jersey,  U.S. Attorney Chris Christie negotiated a plea agreement with him, under which he pleaded guilty to 18 counts of illegal campaign contributions, tax evasion, and witness tampering. The witness-tampering charge arose from Kushner's act of retaliation against William Schulder, his sister Esther's husband, who was cooperating with federal investigators against Kushner. Kushner hired a prostitute he knew to seduce his brother-in-law, arranged to record a sexual encounter between the two, and had the tape sent to his sister. He was sentenced to two years in prison. He served 14 months at Federal Prison Camp, Montgomery in Alabama before being sent to a halfway house in Newark, New Jersey, to complete his sentence. He was released from prison on August 25, 2006.

As a convicted felon, he was also disbarred and prohibited from practicing law in New Jersey, New York, and Pennsylvania.

In her book Too Much and Never Enough President Trump's niece Mary L. Trump wrote that Charles Kushner had given a speech in which he claimed that Ivanka Trump had only made herself worthy of inclusion in his family by committing to convert to Judaism, which Mary Trump found "a bit rich" given Kushner's own past as a convicted felon.

Pardon by Donald Trump 
Kushner received a federal pardon on December 23, 2020, by his son's father-in-law, Donald Trump, citing his record of "reform" and "charity."

New York City real estate
After being released from prison, Kushner shifted his business activities from New Jersey to New York City. In early 2007, Kushner Companies bought the 666 Fifth Avenue building in Manhattan for $1.8 billion. In August 2018, Brookfield Properties signed a 99-year lease for the property, paying $1.286 billion and effectively taking full ownership of the building.

As of the end of 2016, Kushner and his family were estimated to have a net worth of $1.8 billion. He has employed two fellow inmates he became acquainted with in prison.

Donations
Charles Kushner met personally with Harvard's president and in 1998 donated $2.5 million to Harvard.  His son, Jared, was then beginning his senior year of high school where he was not a particularly good student with test scores below Ivy League standards.  Jared Kushner was admitted to the Harvard freshman class of 1999.

Before 2016, Kushner was a donor to the Democratic Party. He serves on the boards of Touro College, Stern College for Women, Rabbinical College of America, and the United Jewish Communities. Kushner has made other donations to Harvard University, Stern College, and United Cerebral Palsy. He donated to the Seryl and Charles Kushner Maternity Unit at St. Barnabas Medical Center in Livingston, New Jersey.  He contributed to the funding of two schools, Joseph Kushner Hebrew Academy and Rae Kushner Yeshiva High School, also in Livingston, and named them after his parents. Kushner Hall is a building that is named after him on the Hofstra University campus. The campus of Jerusalem's Shaare Zedek Medical Center is named the "Seryl and Charles Kushner Campus" in honor of their donation of $20 million.

In August 2015, Kushner donated $100,000 to Donald Trump's Make America Great Again PAC, a super PAC supporting Trump's 2016 campaign for the presidency. Kushner and his wife also hosted a reception for Trump at their Jersey Shore seaside mansion in Long Branch.

See also
Kushner family

References

External links
 Kushner Companies in the FBI's FOIA Library The Vault

1954 births
Living people
20th-century American businesspeople
21st-century American businesspeople
American prisoners and detainees
Prisoners and detainees of the United States federal government
American businesspeople convicted of crimes
American chief executives
American Orthodox Jews
American people convicted of tax crimes
American people of Belarusian-Jewish descent
American political fundraisers
American real estate businesspeople
Businesspeople from New Jersey
Jewish American philanthropists
Charles
Maurice A. Deane School of Law alumni
Disbarred American lawyers
New York (state) lawyers
New Jersey lawyers
Pennsylvania lawyers
Businesspeople from Elizabeth, New Jersey
People from Livingston, New Jersey
New York University Stern School of Business alumni
Real estate and property developers
American company founders
Recipients of American presidential pardons